The South Shields by-election of 1910 was held on 27 October 1910, after the Liberal incumbent Sir William Robson resigned to become a Lord of Appeal. The by-election was won by the Liberal Candidate, Russell Rea.

Result

References 

1910 elections in the United Kingdom
1910 in England
20th century in County Durham
Unopposed by-elections to the Parliament of the United Kingdom (need citation)
South Shields by-elections